A partial lunar eclipse occurred on 19 November 2021. The eclipse occurred towards a micromoon. This was the longest partial lunar eclipse since 18 February 1440, and the longest until 8 February, 2669; however, many eclipses, including the November 2022 lunar eclipse, have a longer period of umbral contact at next to 3 hours 40 minutes. 

This lunar eclipse was the second of an almost tetrad, the others being 26 May 2021 (T), 16 May 2022 (T) and 08 Nov 2022 (T).

Visibility
In northern and western Europe and the westernmost parts of Africa, the first phase of the eclipse was visible, as the Moon set below the horizon on the morning of Friday, 19 November 2021. The fullest extent of the lunar eclipse was visible over North and South America after midnight on Friday, with the event beginning in the latest hours of Thursday night over parts of Alaska and Hawaii. The entirety of the eclipse, from one side of the Earth's shadow to the other, occurred with the Moon visible above the horizon in nearly all of North America.

In the Eastern Hemisphere, as the partially-eclipsed Moon began to rise at dusk, the eclipse became visible across the Pacific Ocean, Australia, and much of Asia. At places in extreme northern latitudes and areas in northern and eastern Russia, such as Kamchatka, the Moon was already visible by the time the eclipse began on Friday (and the eclipse ended just near Saturday midnight). There was little or no visibility for most of Africa, eastern Europe, and western or southern parts of Asia, including the Middle East and much of the Indian subcontinent.

Observations

Related eclipses

Other eclipses of 2021 
 A total lunar eclipse on 26 May.
 An annular solar eclipse on 10 June.
 A total solar eclipse on 4 December.

Lunar year series

Tritos series

Saros series

Metonic series 
 First eclipse: November 20, 2002.
 Second eclipse: November 19, 2021.
 Third eclipse: November 18, 2040.
 Fourth eclipse: November 19, 2059.
 Fifth eclipse: November 19, 2078.

Half-Saros cycle 
A lunar eclipse will be preceded and followed by solar eclipses by 9 years and 5.5 days (a half saros). This lunar eclipse is related to two total solar eclipses of Solar Saros 133.

Tzolkinex 
 Preceded: Lunar eclipse of October 8, 2014
 Followed: Lunar eclipse of December 31, 2028

See also
 List of 21st-century lunar eclipses
 List of lunar eclipses
 November 2022 lunar eclipse

References

External links

Saros cycle 126

2021-11
2021 in science
November 2021 events